The Seiberling Mansion is a historic house located at Kokomo, Indiana, United States.  In 1887, Monroe Seiberling of Akron, Ohio, traveled to Kokomo to open the Kokomo Strawboard Company, which would make shoeboxes out of straw and employ seventy-five people. Within six months, Seiberling, uncle of Goodyear Tire and Rubber Company founder Frank Seiberling, sold the Kokomo Strawboard Company and opened the Diamond Plate Glass Company.  He began construction on his mansion in October 1889 at a cost of $50,000, with construction ending within two years.  The mansion is built in a mixture of Neo-Jacobean (Queen Anne) and Romanesque Revival styles.

In 1972, the Seiberling Mansion was listed on the National Register of Historic Places.  It is located in the Old Silk Stocking Historic District.

The mansion is owned by the Howard County Historical Society and serves as the main museum of the Howard County Historical Museum.

References

External links
 Howard County Historical Museum

National Register of Historic Places in Howard County, Indiana
Houses in Howard County, Indiana
Houses completed in 1891
Museums in Howard County, Indiana
Kokomo, Indiana
Historic house museums in Indiana
Tudor Revival architecture in Indiana
Romanesque Revival architecture in Indiana
Houses on the National Register of Historic Places in Indiana